The siege of Albazin was a military conflict between the Tsardom of Russia and Qing China from 1685 to 1686. It ultimately ended in the surrender of Albazin to Qing China and Russian abandonment of the Amur River area in return for trading privileges in Beijing.

Background
After the Battle of Hutong (1658), the Russians made no formal attempt to gain control of the Amur River valley. However they did actively compete with the Manchus for the allegiance of nearby peoples. In 1667, the Hamnigan Buryat leader Gantimur refused a Qing request to join them in military operations against the Russians and went over to the other side. The Qing tried to win him back with gifts, and when that didn't work, demanded that the Russians extradite him, which also didn't work. The Qing were unable to immediately mount a military expedition against the Russians at this time due to being hampered by a lack of supplies in the Amur region.

Russian territory west of Lake Baikal was consolidated in 1661 with the foundation of Irkutsk, however expansion south was halted in 1663 with a defeat in Uriankhai territory. Russian migration into the area also intensified with the relocation of exiles from Lithuania and Poland. From these exiles came the Polish Nikifor Chernigovsky, who in 1665 murdered his guards at Ilimsk, and fled with a gang of escaped prisoners to Albazin, where they rebuilt the fort. While technically a refugee, Chernigovsky collected tribute from the local peoples and sent part of it to the authorities in Nerchinsk. In 1672, the Russian authorities in Nerchinsk formally claimed Albazin. Chernigovsky was captured and sent back to Moscow, where he was pardoned and sent back to the Amur. Unlike other parts of the Russian Far East, Albazin's lands were fertile and the fort quickly grew to a settlement with buildings multiplying and farms spreading throughout the valley.

Qing presence in the region also expanded in the 1680s with the construction of forts at Aigun and Mergen, and a dock at Girin. An office was set up at Butha to administrate the hunter gatherers of the Greater and Lesser Khingan ranges.

Siege of 1685
In June 1686, Langtan led a force of 3,000 Qing soldiers to lay siege on Albazin, which was held by some 450 men led by Alexei Tolbuzin. According to Russians sources, the Qing had a "great might of guns" and even more powerful cannons than the Hongyipao, called "miraculous-power general cannons". More than a hundred Russians died from bombardment on the first day of the siege. The Russian side surrendered the next day and were allowed to leave for Nerchinsk, however many Russians decided to defect to the Qing instead. Albazin and the nearby villages and the monastery were razed, but for some reason the crops were left untouched.

Siege of 1686

The Russians returned to Albazin to reap the crops. This time they built a stout bastion fort with the help of a Prussian military expert by the name of Afanasii Ivanovich Beiton, who had been captured in 1667 by the Russians and sent as a prisoner to Siberia. The new walls, made of an earthen core, were reinforced with a weave of clay and tree roots, making them uncommonly strong.

In July 1686, Langtan came back with 3,000 soldiers and laid siege to Albazin again. This time the Qing forces were unable to penetrate the walls despite many attempts. On 23 July, the Qing made a direct assault on the southern wall after bombardment from cannons, but were forced to retreat with heavy losses. The Russians however made several successful sallies, sometimes even taking prisoners. They became too confident at one point and fell into an ambush while trying to dismantle the enemy siegeworks. Due to the bastions and design of the fortress, the Qing were unable to gain an advantageous position to bombard the defending forces. In early August, the Qing established walls around the fort and cut off Russian access to the river. The Russians tried to prevent this but failed after fighting for four days straight. A complete blockade had been erected around Albazin by the end of August. The Russians became very sick and started dying from scurvy, typhus, and cholera. Of the 800 defenders who held Albazin at the beginning of the siege, no more than 150 remained alive by early November. The Qing forces too suffered heavily, although not as much as the Russians, and by November less than half of the original 3,000 remained.

In October 1686, Russian envoys from Moscow arrived in Beijing seeking peace. The Kangxi Emperor sent a messenger to Albazin, arriving in December, and announced the cessation of the siege. Of the 800 defenders, only 24 survived. They were permitted to leave the fort, buy supplies, and were provided with provisions by the Qing forces. The Qing army withdrew and left Albazin the next year. The Russians rebuilt their villages and cultivated the fields but were not allowed to hunt because it was viewed as infringing on Chinese sovereignty. Albazin was relinquished to the Qing in the Treaty of Nerchinsk of 1689 in return for Russian trading privileges in Beijing.

Aftermath
Fearing that the Khori and Solon would side with the Russians, the Qing had their communities relocated to Manchu lands. Most of them either died of starvation or were assimilated into the Eight Banners. In August 1689, the Treaty of Nerchinsk, which saw the official surrender of the Amur region by the Russians to the Manchus, was agreed upon under threat of arms from the Qing. The treaty allowed the Russians to trade in Beijing and a caravan route was set up from Nerchinsk via the Nonni River. The Qing further consolidated their presence in Heilongjiang with garrisons in Qiqihar and Butha in 1691, however they made virtually no attempt to patrol their Amur frontier, rather opting to depopulate the northern bank of the Amur river. In the Qing view, the possibility of tribal peoples raiding Qing territory from Russian territory was a greater threat than a direct Russian incursion.

The Treaty of Kyakhta (1727) was signed in 1728 demarking the international border between the two empires in northern Mongolia. Kyakhta became a trading town with both a Russian and Chinese populace. Midway between the Chinese town and Russian fortress two posts were planted, one inscribed with Russian and the other with Manchu writing.

References

Bibliography
 .

 

Albazin
1680s in Russia
1680s in China
Amur Oblast (Russian Empire)
China–Russia military relations
Albazin